On the Way to Wonderland is the debut album by the Finnish rock band Sunrise Avenue.

Track listing
 "Choose to Be Me"
 "Forever Yours"
 "All Because of You"
 "Fairytale Gone Bad"
 "Diamonds"
 "Heal Me"
 "It Ain't the Way"
 "Make It Go Away"
 "Destiny"
 "Sunny Day"
 "Only"
 "Into the Blue"
 "Romeo"
 "Fight 'Til Dying"
 "Wonderland"
Bonus songs in special edition
 "Nasty" (Acoustic Bonus)
 "Forever Yours" (Nightliner Mix)
 "Forever Yours" (Acoustic Version)
 "Fairytale Gone Bad" (Acoustic Version)

Personnel
Jukka Backlund - Arranger, Keyboards, Vocals (background), Producer, Engineer, Mixing, Group Member
Thomas Eberger - Mastering
Björn Engelmann Cutting Room Studios - Mastering
Samu Haber - Guitar, Arranger, Vocals, Group Member
Ville Juurikkala - Photography
Sami Osala - Arranger, Drums, Group Member
Raul Ruutu - Bass, Arranger, Vocals (background), Group Member
Janne Kärkkäinen - Guitar, Arranger, Vocals (background), Group Member

Charts

Weekly charts

Year-end charts

Certifications

References

External links
 Sunriseavenue.com

2006 albums
Sunrise Avenue albums
European Border Breakers Award-winning albums